SS Dettifoss was an Icelandic Cargo Ship that was Torpedoed by  in the Irish Sea  out of Belfast, United Kingdom, while she was travelling from New York, United States to Belfast, United Kingdom and later to Reykjavík, Iceland.

Construction 
Dettifoss was constructed in 1930 at the Frederikshavns Vaerft & Flydedok A/S shipyard in Frederikshavn, Denmark.

She had a Compound expansion engine driving a single screw propeller and the engine was rated at 124 nhp.

Sinking 
On 21 February 1945, Dettifoss was on a voyage in Convoy UR 155 from New York, United States to Belfast, United Kingdom and later to Reykjavík, Iceland with a general cargo of 1300 tons. Dettifoss sank within 7 minutes resulting in the death of 12 crew members and 3 passengers. All public activities in Iceland were cancelled on 24 February 1945.

Wreck 

References

Cargo ships of Iceland
1930 ships
Ships built in Denmark
Ships sunk by German submarines in World War II
Maritime incidents in February 1945
Shipwrecks in the Irish Sea